Golubino is a rural locality (a selo) in Novooskolsky District, Belgorod Oblast, Russia. The population was 1,154 as of 2010. There are 5 streets.

Geography 
Golubino is located 14 km northwest of Novy Oskol (the district's administrative centre) by road. Miroshniki is the nearest rural locality.

References 

Rural localities in Novooskolsky District